Microsoft Assistance Markup Language (Microsoft AML, generally referred to as MAML) is an XML-based markup language developed by the Microsoft User Assistance Platform team to provide user assistance ("online help") for the Microsoft Windows Vista operating system. It makes up the Assistance Platform on Windows Vista.

MAML is also used to provide help information for PowerShell V2 Cmdlets, modules and advanced functions.

Concept 

MAML is a departure from all previous types of user assistance for Windows operating systems. Some of its features have been available in .NET Framework 2, but more options shipped with the release of .NET Framework 3. Previously, user assistance for Windows operating systems used Microsoft Compiled HTML Help files, which contains little machine-readable semantic information.

The most significant aspect of MAML is that it shifts the production of user assistance to the concept of structured authoring (somewhat similar to DITA or DocBook). Documents and their constituent elements are defined by their context. With MAML, the emphasis is on content and the tasks a user performs with a computer, not the features of the software. Presentation is managed as part of the rendering engine when a user requests a topic.

The structured feature of MAML means that it can express a wide range of active concepts as well. One notable feature is guided help (active content wizard), which allows the help file to either run a task automatically or highlight the parts of the screen a user should interact with step-by-step. This feature was considered a highlight of Project Longhorn, but Microsoft decided against including it in the final Vista release.

The MAML authoring structure is divided into segments related to a type of content: conceptual, FAQ, glossary, procedure, reference, reusable content, task, troubleshooting, and tutorial.

Presentation 

Three levels of transformation occur when a topic is displayed: structure, presentation, and rendering:
 The structural transformation contains reusable content and applies conditional logic to determine the structure that content should take when it is displayed, and the content of the text itself.
 The presentation transformation enables content authored in MAML to use many different formats, including DHTML, XAML, RTF, and printed material.
 The rendering transformation applies style sheets and displays the final content to users.

Authoring 
At present, there are no Microsoft released automated tools to assist in the creation of MAML - you need to create the XML files by hand.

Unfortunately, there is no decent tool available for IT Pros to author MAML. You can use Notepad (which is pretty tedious). James O'Neil (former MSFT employee) shows you how you can use InfoPath to author this information, but this is far from perfect as his article suggests.

Format 
The h1s help file format, along with the HelpPane viewer, is found in Windows Vista and Windows 7. The format is similar to Microsoft Help 2 hxs. A third party "xHelpMarkup" tool for compiling and decompiling exists, but it is only a wrapper around the BDD 2007 apcompnt and apss.dll tools.

See also
 MHTML
 Sandcastle
 WinHelp

References

External links
 Microsoft Vista User Experience Guidelines at the MSDN Library
 Assistance Platform Team Blog at the Microsoft Developer Network (discontinued)
 Sandcastle MAML Guide
 Help-Info.de MAML documentation

Markup languages
Assistance Markup Language
Online help
Windows Vista